The sixth series of the British children's television series The Dumping Ground began broadcasting on 12 January 2018 on CBBC and ended on 7 December 2018. The series follows the lives of the children living in the fictional children's care home of Ashdene Ridge, nicknamed by them "The Dumping Ground". It consisted of twenty-four, thirty-minute episodes, airing in two halves in January and September; ten episodes for the second half premiered a week early on BBC iPlayer. It is the fourteenth series in The Story of Tracy Beaker franchise.

Cast

Main

Guest

Episodes

Notes
Episodes 13-22 of the series premiered on BBC iPlayer exactly a week before their TV airing; the figures in the table above refer to the date of their first broadcast (i.e. on BBC iPlayer).
From series 6b onwards, all viewing figures are four-screen ratings which include pre-transmission viewing.

References

2018 British television seasons
The Dumping Ground